The 24th Moscow International Film Festival was held from 21 to 30 June 2002. The Golden St. George was awarded to the Italian-French film Resurrection directed by Paolo and Vittorio Taviani.

Jury
 Chinghiz Aitmatov (Kyrgyzstan – President of the Jury)
 Fruit Chan (Hong Kong)
 Rakhshan Bani-E'temad (Iran)
 Jessica Hausner (Austria)
 Dominique Borg (France)
 Jos Stelling (Netherlands)
 Randa Haines (United States)
 Karen Shakhnazarov (Russia)

Films in competition
The following films were selected for the main competition:

Awards
 Golden St. George: Resurrection by Paolo and Vittorio Taviani
 Silver St.George:
 Best Director: Aleksandr Rogozhkin for The Cuckoo
 Best Actor: Ville Haapasalo for The Cuckoo
 Best Actress: Mikako Ichikawa for Blue
 Special Jury Prize: Wishes of the Land by Vahid Mousaian
 Stanislavsky Award: Harvey Keitel
 FIPRESCI Prize: The Cuckoo by Aleksandr Rogozhkin
 FIPRESCI Special Mention: The Supplement by Krzysztof Zanussi

References

External links
Moscow International Film Festival: 2002 at Internet Movie Database

2002
2002 film festivals
2002 festivals in Europe
2002 in Russian cinema
2002 in Moscow
June 2002 events in Russia